Microberlinia bisulcata is a species of plant in the family Fabaceae, a lowland rainforest tree that is found only in Cameroon. It is threatened by habitat destruction and exploitation. Common names include African zebrawood, tigerwood, zebrano and zingana.

Description
The lower half of the cylindrical trunk is devoid of branches. The leaves are small and the flowers are pea-like. The roots have an ectomycorrhizal association with fungi in the soil.

Distribution and habitat
Microberlinia bisulcata is endemic to southwestern Cameroon. It is present in Korup National Park, Loum Forest Reserve and on the northern and western foothills of Mount Cameroon. Records from elsewhere are unreliable. It occurs in lowland rainforest, typically in flat sandy areas.

Uses

This tree is harvested for its valuable timber. The wood texture is coarse and the grain interlocking. The wood is moderately durable and is used for turnery, furniture-making and cabinet-making; it can be used to make objects such as tool handles, panelling and veneers. It is resistant to tunneling insects and moderately resistant to termites and wood-rotting fungi.

Status
Microberlinia bisulcata is selectively felled for its timber and is threatened by habitat loss, with the forest being cleared to make way for agricultural land, palm oil plantations and oil extraction. It has been extirpated from part of its range in the foothills of Mount Cameroon, and is threatened by illegal logging in the forest reserve, but should be secure in Korup National Park. Altogether, the International Union for Conservation of Nature considers the tree to be Critically Endangered. Conservation efforts include collecting seeds, establishing tree nurseries and planting saplings in selected locations.

References

Detarioideae
Trees of Africa
Endemic flora of Cameroon
Critically endangered plants
Plants described in 1946
Taxonomy articles created by Polbot
Taxa named by Auguste Chevalier